Anna Hamilton Phelan is an American actress and scriptwriter. She has been nominated for an Oscar for her work on Gorillas in the Mist, and was also nominated for a Writers Guild of America Award for her work on Mask.

Life 
Phelan grew up in central Pennsylvania. She studied theater arts at Emerson College in Boston until 1965. Phelan left Boston after her studies and moved to New York City to pursue a career as a theatre actress. There she started to write her own monologues.

After a few years in New York, Phelan moved to Los Angeles, where she worked as an actress in TV productions. She took a serious turn to scriptwriting when she "was in a television film as a dance hall girl and the producer recast her as the madam." Phelan later combined her written monologues with feminist texts and toured with her solo show Corsages and Ketchup in the early 1970s. Afterwards she married and became a mother of two kids.

During her training at Harbor General Hospital she met Roy L. Dennis (1961–1978) and later his mother Florence Tullis, and convinced her to write a script about her son's story. Phelan attended two workshops of screenwriter Syd Field and during the second workshop she wrote the first draft of Mask, which was made into a feature film in 1985 by Peter Bogdanovich.

She then was approached by the head of Universal Pictures at the time, Frank Price, who asked her to write the screenplay for Gorillas in the Mist.

After that, she specialized her work as a scriptwriter on "women's parts, experience, and preference." She has been known to go through extensive research prior to writing her films and roles. Before writing Into the Homeland, a film about a group of Neo-Nazi's who kidnap the daughter of an ex-cop, Phalan spent time at the headquarters of a far right organization in order to gain more knowledge of the roles she was writing.

Themes 
She is known for writing strong women's roles, such as Cher's role in Mask (1985), as a caring and supportive mother towards her son who has a skull deformity, and Sigourney Weaver's part in Gorillas in the Mist (1988), who devotes her life to the study of primates and a strong fighter against illegal poaching in the African jungle. After Gorillas in the Mist, Sigourney Weaver told her "if you and other writers stop writing about female characters, then our daughters and granddaughters will have no female images on the screen to identify with at all" and Phelan took that as a responsibility of hers to keep creating positive roles for women on screen.

Filmography

Writer 
 Mask (1985)
 Into the Homeland (1987)
 Gorillas in the Mist (1988)
 In Love and War (1996)
 Girl, Interrupted (1999)
 Amelia (2009)

Actress
 Mask (1985)

References

External links 
 

Living people
American screenwriters
Place of birth missing (living people)
Year of birth missing (living people)
American women screenwriters
Writers Guild of America
21st-century American women